Cardinal Cybo or Cibo may refer to:

Lorenzo Cybo de Mari (died 1503), Italian cardinal
Innocenzo Cybo or Cibo (1491–1550), Italian cardinal and archbishop of Genoa
Camillo Cybo or Cibo (1681-1743), Italian cardinal, Protector of Santa Maria degli Angeli
Alderano Cybo (1613–1700), Italian cardinal

See also
Cybo family, to which many of the cardinals belonged